Hertog or Den Hertog is a Dutch surname meaning "(the) duke". Other variants include Hertogh, Hertoghe, and Hertogs. Notable people with the surname include:

Hertog 
Alois De Hertog (1927–1993), Belgian racing cyclist
Damiën Hertog (born 1974),  Dutch footballer
Fedor den Hertog (1946–2011), Dutch racing cyclist
Roger Hertog (born 1941), American businessman and financier
Ronald Hertog (born 1989), Dutch paralympic javelin thrower
Thomas Hertog (born 1975), Belgian theoretical physicist

Hertogh 
Isabelle de Hertogh (born 1972), Belgian film and stage actress
Maria Hertogh (1937–2009), Dutch woman whose custody trial in 1950 lead to riots in Singapore

Hertoghe 
Alain Hertoghe (born 1959), Belgian journalist
André Dehertoghe (1941–2016), Belgian runner
Joanna de Hertoghe (c. 1566–1630), medieval nun in Ghent

Hertogs 
Koos Hertogs (1949–2015), Dutch serial killer

See also
Hartog, surname of the same origin
Hertog, Dutch brand of ice cream
Sign of Hertoghe

References

Dutch-language surnames